The 1984 Pro Bowl was the 34th Pro Bowl, the annual all-star game of the National Football League (NFL), and featured the outstanding performers from the 1983 season. The game was contested by teams representing the National Football Conference (NFC) and American Football Conference (AFC), and played on January 29, 1984, at Aloha Stadium in Honolulu, Hawaii before a crowd of 50,445. The NFC won the game 45–3.

Chuck Knox of the Seattle Seahawks led the AFC team against an NFC team coached by San Francisco 49ers head coach Bill Walsh. The referee was Jerry Seeman.

Joe Theismann of the Washington Redskins was named the game's Most Valuable Player. Players on the winning NFC team received $10,000 apiece while the AFC participants each took home $5,000.

AFC roster

Offense

Defense

Special teams

NFC roster

Offense

Defense

Special teams

Box score

References

External links

Pro Bowl
Pro Bowl
Pro Bowl
Pro Bowl
Pro Bowl
American football competitions in Honolulu
January 1984 sports events in the United States